Patricia Mary "Kim" Woodburn ( McKenzie; born 25 March 1942) is an English television personality, writer, and former cleaner. She is known for co-presenting the Channel 4 series How Clean Is Your House? (2003–2009) with Aggie MacKenzie, and also starred in the Canadian series Kim's Rude Awakenings (2007–2009). In 2009, Wooburn appeared on the ninth series of I'm a Celebrity...Get Me Out of Here!, finishing as runner-up. In 2017, she appeared on the nineteenth series of Celebrity Big Brother, finishing in third place.

Early life
Patricia Mary McKenzie was born in Eastney, Hampshire on 25 March 1942 to Mary Patricia (née Shaw) and Ronald McKenzie. Woodburn says that she was constantly beaten by her mother throughout her childhood and neglected by her father, who she said later attempted to molest her as a teenager. Woodburn has a sister and a brother, and several half-siblings born to her mother and various men. She left home at the age of 15 and moved to Liverpool where she worked as a live-in cleaner for a family. Woodburn's mother died in April 2000.

Career

How Clean Is Your House? 
In 2002, Woodburn was hired as a co-presenter of new show How Clean Is Your House? with Aggie MacKenzie, which began airing in May 2003.  From August to September 2009, the sixth and final series of How Clean is Your House? was aired. From 2007 to 2009, Woodburn filmed a version of How Clean is Your House in Canada, called Kim's Rude Awakenings. In August 2009, Woodburn announced to Now magazine that she would not be making any further series of How Clean Is Your House? and Channel 4 announced soon afterwards that the series had been cancelled.

Television appearances 
In November 2009, Woodburn was announced as a contestant for the ninth series of I'm a Celebrity...Get Me Out of Here!. She finished as runner-up to Gino D'Acampo.  In March 2010, she appeared on Celebrity Come Dine with Me on Channel 4 alongside Claire Sweeney, Darren Day and Tom O'Connor. In 2011, Woodburn became a regular panellist on the Big Brother spin-off series, Big Brother's Bit on the Side. In November 2011, she entered the house to set a shopping task which she also judged, while berating the housemates for their hygiene.

In February 2013, Woodburn teamed up with chef, Rosemary Shrager, and the pair appeared on the fifth series of Let's Dance for Comic Relief as contestants. They danced to "Diamonds Are a Girl's Best Friend" by Marilyn Monroe. They were eliminated by the panel of judges. In 2014, Woodburn appeared as a contestant on an episode of The Chase Celebrity Specials.

In March 2016, Woodburn took part in the second series of Famous, Rich and Homeless for BBC One. Her controversial comments on the lives of rough sleepers and some of them that she met led to a dispute between her, the public and the other volunteers on the show. In April 2016, Woodburn and her husband, Pete, appeared on Channel 4's A Place in the Sun: Winter Sun in order to find a holiday home in Costa del Sol, which was to be their home during the winter months. Their budget was £320,000 and they were shown five two-three bedroom penthouses. They put two offers forward of £285,000 and then £295,000 on a apartment but both were turned down by the Norwegian owner.

In January 2017, Woodburn entered the Celebrity Big Brother house to participate as a housemate in its nineteenth series, entering on Day 11. She finished in third place on Day 32.

In August 2018, Woodburn made a controversial appearance on ITV's Loose Women. She was asked if she would make amends with Coleen Nolan, but left after a reception by the panel that was widely described as "bullying". The incident resulted in almost 8,000 people complaining to Ofcom. In 2022, Woodburn made various guest appearances on GB News and was a contestant on the E4 cooking competition Celeb Cooking School, where she was eliminated first.

Other ventures 
In 2006, Woodburn wrote an autobiography, Unbeaten, which detailed her early life. She used this book to reveal that in February 1966, when she was 23 years old, she gave birth to a baby, three months prematurely, who was stillborn. This revelation led to a police investigation, which she readily assisted with.

She has appeared in various pantomimes in theatres all over the UK. Her first pantomime performance was in the Cinderella as an Ugly Sister, alongside television co-star Aggie MacKenzie, at the Theatre Royal in Brighton – it ran from 7 December 2007 to 6 January 2008. From 15 December 2010 to 3 January 2011, she made her second appearance in pantomime in Cinderella at the Woodville Halls Theatre in Gravesend – but this time, she played the Fairy Godmother. From 11 December 2012 to 26 December, she played the Wicked Stepmother in Cinderella at the Grimsby Auditorium. She performed in pantomime for the fourth time at the Southport Theatre in Jack and the Beanstalk – she played Fairy Starlight. The season ran from 13 December 2013 to 31 December 2013. Her fifth appearance in pantomime ran from 12 December 2014 to 11 January 2015 – she played Fairy Liquid in Snow White and the Seven Dwarfs at The Brindley in Runcorn. From 7 December 2018 to 2 January 2019 at the Epstein Theatre in Liverpool – she played the Wicked Queen Snow White and the Seven Dwarfs – this was her sixth appearance in pantomime.

Woodburn was set to tour in 2019 and early 2020, over the UK with her chat-show style stage show, An Audience with Kim Woodburn, where she was going to be interviewed
to speak about her life and career and take questions from an audience, however it was cancelled due to low demand. In 2022, Woodburn released a range of cleaning products at Poundland.

Personal life
Woodburn's first marriage to Kenneth Davies ended in divorce in 1975. She married Peter Woodburn in 1979 and they live together in Cheshire. They had no children.

Filmography

Guest appearances
V Graham Norton (4 June 2003) – 1 episode
This Morning (4 November 2003, 23 November 2004, 6 September 2006, 26 November 2010, 6 February 2017) – 5 episodes
Richard & Judy (12 November 2003, 22 August 2006) – 2 episodes
Children In Need 2003 (21 November 2003) – 1 episode
The Terry and Gaby Show (24 November 2003) – 1 episode
Hogmanay Live (31 December 2003) – 1 episode
National Television Awards Party of the Year (3 January 2004) – 1 episode
Hell's Kitchen (4 June 2004, 27 April 2009) – 3 episodes
Friday Night with Jonathan Ross (17 September 2004) – 1 episode
EastEnders: Christmas Party (23 December 2004) – 1 episode
Today with Des and Mel (24 February 2005) – 1 episode
Dirty Tricks (7 October 2005) – 1 episode
The Paul O'Grady Show (16 November 2005) – 1 episode
The F Word (1 December 2005) – 1 episode
Grumpy Old Women (26 May 2006) – 1 episode
Countdown: Championship of Champions (12–16 June 2006) – 5 episodes
The Wright Stuff (14 September 2006, 12 January 2018) – 2 episodes
Loose Women (28 September 2006, 29 May 2007, 13 November 2007, 6 August 2008, 14 December 2009, 15 March 2010, 29 March 2010, 21 March 2011, 22 November 2011, 28 February 2017, 29 August 2018) – 11 episodes
Heaven and Earth with Gloria Hunniford (1 October 2006) – 1 episode
Children in Need 2006 (17 November 2006) – 1 episode
Who Wants to Be a Millionaire? (23 December 2006) – 1 episode
BBC Breakfast (8 February 2007, 17 September 2007) – 2 episodes
The Friday Night Project (16 February 2007) – 1 episode
Comic Relief Does Car Booty (4 March 2007) – 1 episode
Tonightly (18 August 2008) – 1 episode
The Gadget Show (16 March 2009) – 1 episode
Shooting Stars (16 September 2009) – 1 episode
[[I'm a Celebrity: Extra Camp|I'm a Celebrity...Get Me Out of Here! NOW!]] (4 December 2009) – 1 episodeCelebrity Eggheads (10 December 2009) – 1 episodeVictoria Wood: Seen on TV (21 December 2009) – 1 episodeCelebrity Come Dine with Me (14 March 2010) – 1 episodeCountdown (29 March–2 April 2010) – 5 episodesThe Michael Ball Show (16 August 2010) – 1 episodeStarlight for the Children (16 February 2011) – 1 episodeComic Relief: Uptown Downstairs Abbey (18 March 2011) – 1 episodeCelebrity Juice (10 November 2011) – 1 episodeCelebrity Big Brother's Bit on the Side (24 August 2012, 3 February 2017, 16 August 2018) – 3 episodesThe Alan Titchmarsh Show (2 November 2012, 11 September 2013, 22 October 2013, 21 October 2014) – 4 episodesPointless Celebrities (8 December 2012, 19 October 2013) – 2 episodesLet's Dance for Sport Relief (23 February 2013) – 1 episodeThis Week (18 April 2013) – 1 episodeAll Star Mr & Mrs (19 June 2013) – 1 episodeBig Brother's Bit on the Side (4 July 2013, 3 July 2014, 12 August 2014, 5 November 2018) – 4 episodesLet's Do Lunch with Gino & Mel (12 July 2013) – 1 episodeCelebrity Fifteen to One (20 September 2013) – 1 episodeThe Chase: Celebrity Special (19 October 2013) – 1 episodeDuck Quacks Don't Echo (6 October 2014) – 1 episodeKeep It in the Family (30 November 2014) – 1 episode2000s: The Best of Bad TV (21 August 2015) – 1 episodeCelebrity 100% Hotter (10 January 2017) – 1 episodeThe Story of Reality TV (6 June 2018) – 1 episodeThe Imitation Game (23 September 2018) – 1 episodeCelebrity Call Centre (22 October 2018) – 1 episodeThe Podge and Rodge Show (26 November 2018) – 1 episodeGranada Reports (28 December 2018) – 1 episodeBritain's Favourite Sweets (27 January 2019) – 1 episodeBritain's Favourite Crisps (24 March 2019) – 1 episodeTenable All Stars (12 May 2019) – 1 episodeI'm a Celebrity...Surviving the Jungle (17 December 2019) – 1 episodeMorning T&T (19 December 2019) – 1 episodeJoe Lycett's Got Your Back (17 April 2020) – 1 episodeServed! With Jade Thirlwall (4 June 2020) – 1 episodeWhen Celebrity Goes Horribly Wrong 2 (11 September 2020) – 1 episodeSteph's Packed Lunch (5 March 2021) – 1 episodeThe Celebrity Circle (9 March 2021) – 1 episodeThe Lateish Show with Mo Gilligan (6 August 2021) – 1 episodeFarage (24 November 2021) – 1 episodeTonight Live with Dan Wootton (25 April 2022, 18 May 2022, 26 May 2022, 22 August 2022, 21 September 2022, 2 November 2022, 21 December 2022)The Big Proud Party Agency (29 June 2022) – 1 episodeTonight Live with Mark Dolan (4 November 2022, 2 December 2022)

 Bibliography How Clean Is Your House? with Aggie MacKenzie (2003) Too Posh to Wash: The Complete Guide to Cleaning Up Your Life with Aggie MacKenzie (2004) The Cleaning Bible: Kim & Aggie's Complete Guide to Modern Household Management with Aggie MacKenzie (2006) Unbeaten: The Story of My Brutal Childhood'' (2006)

References

External links 

1942 births
Writers from Portsmouth
Living people
English television presenters
Janitors
English autobiographers
I'm a Celebrity...Get Me Out of Here! (British TV series) participants
Big Brother (British TV series) contestants
Mass media people from Portsmouth